The 1570s decade ran from January 1, 1570, to December 31, 1579.

References